Peach Kelli Pop I  is the debut album by the Canadian/American Rock band Peach Kelli Pop, released in 2010 on Going Gaga Records.

Track listing

Production
Kenneth Maclaurin  – album design
Perry Shall  – album design editing
Alyssa Iswolsky  – Photos

References

1. http://peachkellipop.com/collections/music/products/peach-kelli-pop-i

2010 albums